"It Was A' For Our Rightful King" (or "It was All For Our Rightful King") is a traditional Jacobite song. The words were written by Robert Burns and published in 1796. It is set to an older tune "Mally Stewart". It was included in the 1817 collection Jacobite Relics. Although dating from after the main period of Jacobite activity, it became a standard during the nostalgic Jacobite era of the nineteenth century.

It describes a Scottish supporter of King James taking up arms in support of the cause, going to Ireland to fight and thereafter going into exile after the failure of the campaign in Ireland.

References

Bibliography
 Bold, Alan. A Burns Companion. Springer, 2016.
 Carruthers, Gerard & Kidd, Colin. Literature and Union: Scottish Texts, British Contexts. Oxford University Press, 2018.
 Gregory, David E. Victorian Songhunters: The Recovery and Editing of English Vernacular Ballads and Folk Lyrics, 1820-1883. Rowman & Littlefield, 2006.

Jacobite songs
1796 songs
18th-century songs
Scottish songs
Robert Burns